Home Coming is a 2006 Greek-Turkish drama film directed by Ömer Ugur.

Cast 
 Memet Ali Alabora as Mustafa
 Sibel Kekilli as Esma
 Altan Erkekli as Hoca
 Civan Canova as Iskenceci Komiser
 Erdal Tosun as Iskenceci polis

References

External links 

2006 drama films
2006 films
Greek drama films
Turkish drama films